Ning Cai may refer to:

 Ning Cai (writer) (born 1982), Singaporean author and magician
 Ning Cai (engineer) (born 1947), Chinese electrical engineer